Skye D. McNiel (born July 11, 1978) is an American politician who served in the Oklahoma House of Representatives from 2006 until 2013. McNiel represented the 29th district.

McNiel did not refile for election in 2014.

Early life and career
McNiel was born in Sapulpa, Oklahoma. She graduated from Bristow High School and then attended Oklahoma State University where she earned a bachelor's degree in both agriculture communications and animal science. She has served as president of the Bristow Education Foundation and the Bristow Chamber of Commerce. McNiel has a strong agricultural background and owns her own business in Bristow, Oklahoma.

McNiel also continues to help with her family's livestock business, Mid America Stockyards at Bristow, which she has been doing since she was ten years old.

Political career
McNiel has served as Assistant Majority Whip, Majority Caucus Vice Chairman and Vice Chair of the Natural Resources Committee, as well as on Economic Development and Financial Services, Higher Education & Career Tech, and Wildlife Committees.

McNiel has been threatened after sponsoring legislation to allow the slaughter of horses in Oklahoma, prompting an Oklahoma State Bureau of Investigation to look into the threats. The legislation, which had the support of the Oklahoma Farm Bureau and Oklahoma Veterinarian Medical Association but has upset animal rights activists, has been signed into law by Governor Mary Fallin.

District
District 29 includes Creek County, Oklahoma and parts of Tulsa County, Oklahoma.

House committees
Natural Resources
Economic Development and Financial Services
Higher Education & Career Tech
Wildlife

References

External links
 Women of the Oklahoma Legislature Oral History Project -- OSU Library

1978 births
21st-century American politicians
21st-century American women politicians
21st-century Native American politicians
Living people
Republican Party members of the Oklahoma House of Representatives
Muscogee (Creek) Nation state legislators in Oklahoma
Native American women in politics
People from Bristow, Oklahoma
People from Sapulpa, Oklahoma
Women state legislators in Oklahoma
20th-century Native Americans
20th-century Native American women
21st-century Native American women